Coleophora nesiotidella is a moth of the family Coleophoridae. It is found on Crete.

References

nesiotidella
Moths described in 2000
Moths of Europe